Memoir(s) of a Murderer may refer to:

Memoir of a Murderer (살인자의 기억법), novel by Kim Young-ha
 Memoir of a Murderer 2017 South Korean film based on the novel
 Memoirs of a Murderer (film), a 2017 Japanese remake of a 2012 Korean film Confession of Murder
 Memoirs of a Murderer (album), a 2014 album by King 810